Shri Varinder Singh Bajwa, a politician from Shiromani Akali Dal party,is a Member of the Parliament of India representing Punjab in the Rajya Sabha, the upper house of the Indian Parliament.

Career 
Varinder Singh Bajwa  began his political career with the Shiromani Akali Dal in 1980. He served as youth Akali leader in the 1980s and was elected as president of Hoshiarpur in 1995. He was Elected to Rajya Sabha  the Upper house of the Parliament   in 2004 from Punjab  his term ended in 2010. He quit Akali Dal in 2010 and joined Manpeeet Badal,s PPP however he quit PPP and  joined Akali Dal again for a Brief period he left Akali dal and joined congress in 2017 he again joined Akali dal before 2022 Punjab Assembly elections and has been member of the Akali dal since then . Varinder Singh Bajwa,s wife Jagjeet  Kaur is a Retired lecturer from Government College Hoshiarpur he has three daughters.

References

 Profile on Rajya Sabha website 

Rajya Sabha members from Punjab, India
Living people
Shiromani Akali Dal politicians
People from Punjab, India
Year of birth missing (living people)
Indian National Congress politicians from Punjab, India